Mustard is a condiment made from the mustard seeds from one of three varieties of mustard plant: Sinapis alba, white mustard (also known as yellow mustard); Brassica juncea, brown mustard; or Brassica nigra, black mustard. The whole, ground, cracked, or bruised mustard seeds are mixed with water, vinegar, or other liquids, and sometimes other flavorings and spices, to create a paste or sauce ranging in color from bright yellow to dark brown.

Mustard brands

A
Amora is a French company most known for its Dijon mustard. It is based in Dijon. Amora is currently a subsidiary of Unilever.

B
Bertman Original Ballpark Mustard created by Joe Bertman in Cleveland is a spicy brown mustard used for more than 90 years at sports stadiums in the Cleveland, Ohio, area and is also sold at retail.
Boar's Head produces a delicatessen-style mustard from an old German recipe that combines white wine and horseradish. The company also produces yellow mustard and honey mustard.

C

 Colman's of Norwich, a British company and brand, is one of the oldest existing food brands, famous for a range of products, almost all being varieties of mustard. It is a subsidiary of Unilever.

D
 Düsseldorfer Löwensenf is a German company and brand. The company was founded in 1903 in Metz (then part of the German Empire due to the outcome of the Franco-Prussian War), and is famous for its Düsseldorf mustard. Currently a subsidiary of Develey Senf & Feinkost GmbH

F
 French's is an American brand of prepared mustard: French's "Cream Salad" mustard, the original American yellow mustard, debuted at the 1904 St. Louis World's Fair. French's is now owned by McCormick & Company.

G

 Grey Poupon is a brand of Dijon mustard which originated in Dijon, France. It is now manufactured by Kraft Heinz. Like other Dijon mustards, Grey Poupon contains a small amount of white wine.
 Gulden's is the third-largest American manufacturer of mustard, after French's and Grey Poupon.  The oldest continuously operating mustard brand in the United States, it is now owned by food industry giant ConAgra Foods. Gulden's is known for its spicy brown mustard, which includes a blend of mustard seeds and spices.

H
 Heinz produces a line of prepared mustards, including yellow, spicy brown, and honey mustards.
 Händlmaier is a German maker of Bavarian-style sweet mustard.

I
 Idun is a Norwegian brand of mustard, ketchup, and various food products.

K

 Keen's is a brand of McCormick Foods Australia Pty Ltd. Keen's Mustard Powder is created from finely crushed mustard seeds.

M

 Maille is a French mustard and pickle company founded in 1747 in Marseille, when it made mostly vinegar. Later, it became well known for its Dijon mustard and cornichon and it subsequently opened an establishment in Dijon. It is a subsidiary of Unilever.
 Meaux - Moutarde de Meaux, aka Pommery is a Dijon mustard.

L 
 Les Trois Petits Cochons (Three Little Pigs), a charcuterie company located in Brooklyn, produces a Dijon and a whole grain mustard.

P

 Plochman's, an American brand of mustard made by Plochman, Inc., is recognizable by its barrel-shaped bottle.
 Podravka, a food company based in Koprivnica, Croatia, produces a brand of mustard.

S
 Stadium Mustard is the trademarked name of a mildly spicy brown mustard served in stadiums and arenas throughout the United States. Manufactured in Illinois since 1890. 
 Silver Spring Foods is a family run business started in 1929. While they are the largest grower and producer of horseradish, they have an extensive specialty mustard line.

T

 Thomy is a Swiss food brand owned by Nestlé; it produces mustard and other condiments such as mayonnaise and salad dressings.
 Turun sinappi – a mustard made in Finland, it is often used with makkara (i.e. sausage).

W
 Williams Sonoma produces a variety of beer mustard.

Z
 Zatarain's, a company based in New Orleans, Louisiana, produces mustard and other condiments and spices.

See also

 Mustard oil
 National Mustard Museum
 List of condiments
 List of brand name condiments

References

External links
 
 

Condiments
Mustard
 
Spices
Mustard